National Highway 41 (NH 41) is a primary national highway in India. This highway runs entirely in the state of Gujarat starting from Samakhiyali and terminating at Narayan Sarovar.

Route 

NH-41 connects Samakhiyali, Gandhidham, Mandvi, Naliya and terminates at Narayan Sarovar in the state of Gujarat.

Junctions  
 
  Terminal near Samakhiyali.
  near Bhimsar
  near Gandhidham

See also 
 List of National Highways in India
 List of National Highways in India by state

References

External links
 NH 41 on OpenStreetMap

National highways in India
National Highways in Gujarat